CVC Capital Partners is a Luxembourg-based private equity and investment advisory firm with approximately US$133 billion of assets under management and approximately €157 billion in secured commitments since inception across American, European and Asian private equity, secondaries and credit funds. As of 31 December 2021, the funds managed or advised by CVC are invested in more than 100 companies worldwide, employing over 450,000 people in numerous countries. CVC was founded in 1981 and, as of 31 March 2022, has over 650 employees working across its network of 25 offices throughout EMEA, Asia and the Americas.

History

Spinout from Citicorp and the 1990s
By the early 1990s, Michael Smith, who joined Citicorp in 1982, was leading Citicorp Venture Capital in Europe along with other managing directors Steven Koltes, Hardy McLain, Donald Mackenzie, Iain Parham, and Rolly Van Rappard. In 1993, Smith and the senior investment professionals of Citicorp Venture Capital negotiated a spinout from Citibank to form an independent private equity firm, CVC Capital Partners. In 2006, the US arm of Citigroup Venture Capital also spun out of the bank to form a new firm, known as Court Square Capital Partners. CVC operated offices in London, Paris and Frankfurt.

Following the spinout, CVC raised its first investment fund with $300 million of commitments, half coming from Citicorp and the rest from high-net-worth individuals and institutional investors. Now independent, CVC also completed its transition from venture capital investments to leveraged buyouts and investments in mature businesses. CVC would follow up with its second fund in 1996, its first fully independent of Citibank, with $840 million of capital commitments.

2000s
By 2000, CVC was one of the largest and best known private equity firms in Europe. In 2001, CVC completed fundraising for its third investment fund, which was the largest private equity fund raised in Europe at the time, just ahead of funds raised by other leading firms, Apax Partners and BC Partners. Also, around the same time, CVC expanded into Asia with a $750 million fund focusing exclusively on investments in Asian companies.

From November 2005 to March 2006, CVC gradually purchased 63.4% of the shares of the Formula One Group, owner of the Formula One auto racing championship.

In 2007, CVC expanded to the U.S., opening an office in New York City, headed by Christopher Stadler and overseen by Rolly van Rappard.

2010s
In 2012, CVC reduced its shares in the Formula One Group to 35.5%. The deputy team principal of Force India, Bob Fernley, accused CVC of "raping the sport" during the period of its involvement in Formula One.

In January 2013, Smith retired from the role of chairman and Koltes, Mackenzie and Van Rappard were appointed co-chairmen of the group.

In February 2015, CVC made its first investment from CVC Growth Partners in Wireless Logic, Europe's largest machine-to-machine managed service provider, acquiring it from ECI Partners.

In March 2015, CVC bought 80% of shares of gambling company Sky Betting & Gaming.

In June 2015, CVC acquired the German perfume retailer Douglas AG for an disclosed fee from  private equity firm Advent International.

In September 2015, CVC opened an office in Warsaw.

In November 2015, CVC and the Canada Pension Plan Investment Board both acquired American pet supplier Petco for a fee of around $4.6 billion.

In April 2016, CVC Capital Partners acquired German betting operator Tipico.

In August 2016, CVC Capital Partners agreed to buy a 15% stake in PT Siloam International Hospitals TbK, among Indonesia's and South East Asia's largest corporate chains of hospitals 

In September 2016, CVC Capital Partners agreed to sell control of the Formula One Group to John Malone's Liberty Media in a deal worth US$4.4bn. The two-part deal would see the US media group buy 18.7 per cent of the F1 parent company Delta Topco for $746mn in cash from a consortium of shareholders led by CVC. In 2017, a second payment of $354mn in cash and $3.3bn in newly issued shares in a Liberty Media tracking stock saw Liberty Media assume full control of Formula One once the deal was approved by regulators, the FIA and Liberty's shareholders.

Towards the end of 2019, CVC Capital Partners purchased Ontic from BBA Aviation for $1.365 billion.

2020s

In November 2021, CVC acquired Unilever's tea brands for £4.5 billion.

Investment funds

Notable investments

 Avast: IT security company
 Gujarat Titans : IPL team
 Petco Holdings Inc.: major pet supplies retail chain
 RAC: automotive rescue service provider in the UK

Controversy
In January 2015, CVC Capital Partners and Bencis Capital Partners were sentenced to pay fines by the Dutch Authority for Consumers and Markets after it charged the former Dutch portfolio company of the two firms, Meneba Beheer, with breaking competition rules through price fixing. The Dutch regulator ruled that the two firms must pay between €450,000 and €1.5 million after Meneba Beheer, which was itself fined €9 million by the authority, was involved in a collective agreement with competitors to keep prices stable between 2001 and 2007.

References

External links

 

 
Private equity firms of the United Kingdom
Investment banking private equity groups
Citigroup
Financial services companies established in 1981
Companies based in Luxembourg City
Financial services companies based in London